The 1828 New York gubernatorial election was held from November 3 to 5, 1828, to elect the Governor and Lieutenant Governor of New York.

United States Senator Martin Van Buren was elected Governor over United States Supreme Court Justice Smith Thompson and journalist Solomon Southwick.

Candidates
The Democratic Party nominated U.S. senator Martin Van Buren. They nominated former U.S. representative and Judge of the Seventh Circuit Enos T. Throop for Lieutenant Governor.

The National Republican Party nominated Supreme Court Justice Smith Thompson. They nominated state assemblyman Francis Granger for Lieutenant Governor.

The Anti-Masonic Party nominated newspaper publisher Solomon Southwick. They nominated state senator John Crary for Lieutenant Governor.

Results
The Democratic ticket of Van Buren and Throop was elected.

Sources
Result: The Tribune Almanac 1841

1828
New York
Gubernatorial election
November 1828 events
Martin Van Buren